Charles Patrick Mulgrew (born 6 March 1986) is a Scottish professional footballer who plays as a centre-back for Scottish Premiership side Dundee United.

Mulgrew began his career at Celtic, during which time he spent time on loan at Dundee United. He then played for Wolverhampton Wanderers, Southend United on loan and Aberdeen. He returned for a second spell with Celtic in 2010, spending six years at the club. In August 2016, Mulgrew left Celtic to join Blackburn Rovers. He played on loan for Wigan Athletic during the 2019–20 season, returning to Blackburn in January 2020, then spending the following season on loan at Fleetwood Town. He signed for Dundee United for a second time in June 2021. Mulgrew has made more than 40 international appearances for Scotland.

Early life
Mulgrew grew up in Kirkintilloch and attended Holy Family Trinity Primary School and St Ninian's High School in the East Dunbartonshire town.

Club career

Celtic
Having progressed through Celtic's youth system alongside Aiden McGeady, Mulgrew turned professional in July 2002. Originally playing at centre back, he was soon encouraged to switch to left back due to the shortage of players in that position at the club. He won the Scottish Youth Cup with the club in 2004–05, beating St Mirren 2–0 at Hampden Park.

Dundee United
In order for him to gain competitive experience, in January 2006 Mulgrew was loaned out to fellow SPL side Dundee United for the remainder of the 2005–06 season. A successful spell at Tannadice saw him feature regularly, scoring twice (both free kicks) in 14 appearances and being named SPL Young Player of the Month for February. He then returned to Celtic hoping to force his way into first team contention, but was transferred to Wolverhampton Wanderers shortly thereafter without ever appearing for the Celtic first team.

Wolverhampton Wanderers
Mulgrew joined Wolves in part exchange for left back Lee Naylor on 23 August 2006. He made his debut for the club on 10 September in a 1–0 win at Leeds United. However, injury kept him out of most of the campaign and he was unable to force his way back into first team contention afterwards.

Southend United
Mulgrew was loaned out to English League One side Southend United at the end of the January transfer window for the remainder of the 2007–08 season, which saw the club lose in the play-offs to Doncaster Rovers. He scored his only goal for the club against Carlisle United.

Aberdeen
Mulgrew was due to join Swindon Town in July 2008 for a fee of approximately £150,000, but pulled out of the move. He eventually left for Aberdeen on 15 July 2008, where he signed a two-year deal, moving for an undisclosed fee.

Mulgrew scored the only goal against Motherwell at Fir Park on 16 August 2008 with a left-footed free kick, in his second competitive match for Aberdeen. He scored two goals, a volley and a free kick, against Celtic in a 3–2 defeat on 27 September 2008.

On 16 May 2009, during the penultimate league match of the 2008–09 season at Ibrox Stadium against Rangers, Mulgrew and Rangers' Kyle Lafferty were at the centre of controversy. As Mulgrew made a clearance from his own half, Lafferty made a sliding tackle on him. Both players squared up to each other and Lafferty fell to the ground clutching his face as though he had been headbutted. Referee Stuart Dougal sent Mulgrew off for violent conduct, but television pictures clearly showed that Mulgrew had not made clear contact with Lafferty. Lafferty was seen to wink to a teammate after Mulgrew had left the field. Mulgrew later had his red card rescinded and Lafferty was given a two-month suspension.

In October 2009, Mulgrew was offered a new contract by Aberdeen, but he rejected the deal and left the club at the end of the 2009–10 season. In 83 games for the Dons, Mulgrew scored ten goals, including a string of free kicks.

Return to Celtic

On 1 July 2010, Mulgrew returned to Celtic on a three-year deal, becoming new manager Neil Lennon's first signing. On 2 January 2011, having played only a handful of games, he played against Rangers in a 2–0 win at Ibrox on the left wing. On 29 January, he deputised for Daniel Majstorović at centre back against former team Aberdeen in a 4–1 League Cup semi-final win at Hampden Park. He scored his first goal for Celtic in that game, nodding home Kris Commons' corner from close range. Mulgrew became a regular in the centre of defence alongside Majstorović. In the Scottish Cup semi-final on 17 April, he scored his second goal for Celtic from a long-range free kick; like his first goal, it was at Hampden Park and against Aberdeen. On 21 May 2011, Mulgrew kept up the trend of scoring at Hampden by netting in the final against Motherwell. He scored the final goal of Celtic's 3–0 win with a free kick into the top corner, and helped earn him his first medal in football.

On 25 August 2011, Mulgrew continued his set piece record by scoring a free kick in Celtic's 1–3 defeat to Sion in their second leg UEFA Europa League qualifier. The following day, Mulgrew signed a contract extension at Celtic to keep him at the club until at least 2015.

On 17 September 2011 he was sent off against Rangers for a second bookable offence, a challenge on Steven Davis. Mulgrew scored his first SPL goal for Celtic on 15 October 2011, a headed equaliser at Rugby Park as Celtic came back from 3–0 down to draw 3–3 with Kilmarnock. On 7 April 2012, Celtic beat Kilmarnock at Rugby Park to confirm them as Scottish Premier League champions. Mulgrew scored two and set up two in the 6–0 win. On 29 April 2012, he scored Celtic's first goal in a 3–0 victory over Rangers. His performances won him the SPL, Players' and writers' player of the year awards for 2011–12. He also picked up Celtic's Player of the Year and Player's Player of the Year awards.

On 21 July 2012 Mulgrew was sent off for a deliberate handball in a pre-season friendly against Ajax at the Amsterdam ArenA. As a result, he missed Celtic's opening 2012–13 SPL game with his former club Aberdeen.

On 1 August 2012, Mulgrew scored the winning goal in Celtic's 2–1 victory against HJK Helsinki in the first leg of the Champions League Third Qualifying Round.

His contract with Celtic expired at the end of the 2015–16 season. Mulgrew was offered the use of Celtic's training facilities during the early part of the 2016–17 season.

Blackburn Rovers

2016–17
On 31 August 2016, Mulgrew signed for Blackburn Rovers on a three-year contract. He scored his first goal for Blackburn in a 1–0 away win against Newcastle United on 26 November 2016 and later scored a free-kick against them in another 1–0 victory in the reverse fixture on 2 January 2017. He made 30 appearances and scored three times in his first season in the club, but they were relegated to League One. Following this, the Lancashire Telegraph reported that Middlesbrough and Hull City were interested in signing him.

2017–18
In July 2017, Blackburn rejected a bid of £200,000 by Sheffield Wednesday. On 24 April 2018, Mulgrew scored the only goal of the game at Doncaster Rovers, which secured promotion back to the Championship. It was his 14th goal of the season, which set a new club record for a defender.

2019–20
On 8 August 2019, Mulgrew signed for Wigan Athletic on a season-long loan deal; The transfer deadline day move almost failed to happen after Mulgrew struggled to find Wigan's Euxton training ground to complete the paperwork in time. During January 2020 Mulgrew opted to end the loan.

2020–21
On 16 October 2020, Mulgrew signed for Fleetwood Town on a season-long loan deal. He scored his first goal for Fleetwood in a 5-1 win against Plymouth Argyle on 21 November 2020. Mulgrew's departure from Rovers was announced at the end of the 2020–21 season.

Dundee United
On 16 June 2021, Mulgrew agreed a two-year deal to return to former loan club Dundee United.

International career
Mulgrew has represented Scotland at all levels up to and including senior international level.

In June 2011, Mulgrew stated that he would consider playing for the United States, whom he was qualified to play for due to an American-born grandmother, if he was continually overlooked for Scotland. In February 2012, Scotland manager Craig Levein handed Mulgrew his first call-up to the senior squad, and he made his international debut on 29 February, starting at left back in a 1–1 draw with Slovenia. He also played in a 5–1 defeat to the USA in Florida in May 2012.

On 7 September 2014, as Scotland began their Euro 2016 qualification with a 2–1 defeat away to Germany, Mulgrew was sent off in stoppage time.

Following the retirement of former club teammate Scott Brown from international football in 2018, Mulgrew was chosen as the new captain of Scotland.

Personal life
Mulgrew's cousin is Canadian lacrosse player Sean Greenhalgh, who plays for the Buffalo Bandits in the National Lacrosse League. Mulgrew married Alana in 2013, and they have two sons and a daughter.

In December 2010, Mulgrew and girlfriend Alana were questioned by Strathclyde Police after businesswoman Michelle Mone alerted them when she saw Mulgrew's child left alone in a car in freezing temperatures. The couple were originally charged with child neglect, although charges were later dropped due to a lack of evidence.

Career statistics

Club

International

Scores and results list Scotland's goal tally first, score column indicates score after each Mulgrew goal.

Honours
Celtic
Scottish Premier League/Scottish Premiership: 2011–12, 2012–13, 2013–14, 2014–15, 2015–16
Scottish Cup: 2010–11, 2012–13

Blackburn Rovers
EFL League One runner-up: 2017–18

Individual
Scottish Premier League Player of the Month: April 2012
PFA Scotland Team of the Year: 2011–12 Scottish Premier League, 2012–13 Scottish Premier League
PFA Scotland Players' Player of the Year: 2011–12
SFWA Footballer of the Year: 2011–12
Celtic Players' Player of the Year: 2011–12
Scottish Premier League Player of the Year: 2011–12
EFL Team of the Season: 2017–18
PFA Team of the Year: 2017–18 League One

See also
List of Scotland national football team captains

References

External links

Charlie Mulgrew Guardian Stats Centre
Profile at AFC Heritage Trust

1986 births
Aberdeen F.C. players
Association football defenders
Celtic F.C. players
Dundee United F.C. players
English Football League players
Living people
People educated at St Ninian's High School, Kirkintilloch
Footballers from Glasgow
Sportspeople from Kirkintilloch
Scotland international footballers
Scottish footballers
Scottish Premier League players
Scottish Professional Football League players
Scotland under-21 international footballers
Southend United F.C. players
Wolverhampton Wanderers F.C. players
Blackburn Rovers F.C. players
Wigan Athletic F.C. players
Fleetwood Town F.C. players